The 2nd constituency of Meuse is a French legislative constituency in the Meuse département.

Description

The 2nd constituency of Meuse covers the northern portion of the department. It includes the town of Verdun infamous for its role in the First World War.

From 1988 until 2017 the seat has been held by Jean-Louis Dumont, a former mayor of Verdun, of the Socialist Party. However, between 1993 and 1997 when it was held by Arsène Lux of the Gaullist RPR.

Historic Representation

Election results

2022 

 
 
|-
| colspan="8" bgcolor="#E9E9E9"|
|-

2017

2012

 
 
 
 
 
 
|-
| colspan="8" bgcolor="#E9E9E9"|
|-

References

Sources
 French Interior Ministry results website: 

2